Eli L. Turkel (hebrew  אלי טורקל) (born January 22, 1944) is an Israeli applied mathematician and currently an emeritus professor of applied mathematics at the School of Mathematical Sciences, Tel Aviv University. He is known for his contributions to numerical analysis of Partial Differential equations particularly in the fields of computational fluid dynamics, computational electromagnetics, acoustics and elasticity.

Research 
His research interests include algorithms for scattering and inverse scattering, image processing, and crack propagation. His most quoted paper is with Jameson and Shmidt (JST) on a Runge-Kutta scheme to solve the Euler equations.  

His other main contributions include fast algorithms for the Navier-Stokes equations based on preconditioning techniques, radiation boundary conditions and high order accuracy for wave propagation in general shaped domains. 

His recent work is on reading ostraca from the first Temple period. Algorithmic handwriting analysis of Judah’s military correspondence sheds light on the composition of biblical texts, which appeared in PNAS was quoted by numerous sources including the front page of the NY Times. Later articles deal with ostraca at both Samaria and Arad. Other research includes high order numerical methods for hyperbolic equations using Cartesian grids but general shaped boundaries and interfaces. Other research uses deep learning to detect sources and obstacles underwater using the acoustic wave equation and data at a few sensors. Other applications of deep learning include using large time steps and improving the accuracy of Finite differences for high frequencies on coarse grids. 
He has also authored articles in Tradition and the Journal of Contemporary Halacha.

Turkel was listed as an ISI highly cited researcher in mathematics. with over 5000 citations.

Education
Turkel was born in New York City, United States. He received his B.A. degree from the Yeshiva University in 1965, M.S. degree from the New York University in 1967, and Ph.D. degree from the Courant Institute at New York University in 1970; all in mathematics. His Ph.D. thesis advisors were J. J. Stoker and Eugene Isaacson. 

He received rabbinical ordination from Rabbi J.B. Soloveitchik.

References

External links

Home page: http://www.math.tau.ac.il/~turkel/
Index book for the Rav Soloveitchik https://www.otzar.org/wotzar/book.aspx?191322&&lang=eng

Yeshiva University alumni
New York University alumni
Academic staff of Tel Aviv University
Israeli mathematicians
Living people
Computational fluid dynamicists
1944 births